Island oak is a common name of Quercus tomentella, an oak in the section Protobalanus.

Island oak may also refer to:

 Island Oak High School, a school on Vancouver Island, in British Columbia
Quercus cedrosensis, also known as Cedros Island oak, a species of plant in the family Fagaceae
Quercus parvula, also known as Santa Cruz Island oak, an evergreen red oak

See also

Oak Island (disambiguation)